In mathematics, the symmetric algebra  (also denoted  on a vector space  over a field  is a commutative algebra over  that contains , and is, in some sense, minimal for this property.

The symmetric algebra  can be built as the quotient of the tensor algebra  by the two-sided ideal generated by the elements of the form .

All these definitions and properties extend naturally to the case where  is a module (not necessarily a free one) over a commutative ring.

Construction

From tensor algebra
It is possible to use the tensor algebra  to describe the symmetric algebra .

It is straightforward to verify that the resulting algebra satisfies the universal property stated in the introduction. The extension of 
to an algebra homomorphism  is unique because  generates  as a -algebra.

This results also directly from a general result of category theory, which asserts that the composition of two left adjoint functors is also a left adjoint functor. Here, the forgetful functor from commutative algebras to vector spaces or modules (forgetting the multiplication) is the composition of the forgetful functors from commutative algebras to associative algebras (forgetting commutativity), and from associative algebras to vectors or modules (forgetting the multiplication). As the tensor algebra and the quotient by commutators are left adjoint to these forgetful functors, their composition is left adjoint to the forgetful functor from commutative algebra to vectors or modules, and this proves the desired universal property.

From polynomial ring
The symmetric algebra  can also be built from polynomial rings. 

It is straightforward to verify that this makes  a solution to the universal problem stated in the introduction. This results also immediately from general considerations of category theory, since free modules and polynomial rings are free objects of their respective categories.

In this case, one has 

(Here, equals signs mean equality up to a canonical isomorphism.) Again this can be proved by showing that one has a solution of the universal property, and this can be done either by a straightforward but boring computation, or by using category theory, and more specifically, the fact that a quotient is the solution of the universal problem for morphisms that map to zero a given subset. (Depending on the case, the kernel is a normal subgroup, a submodule or an ideal, and the usual definition of quotients can be viewed as a proof of the existence of a solution of the universal problem.)

Grading
The symmetric algebra is a graded algebra. That is, it is a direct sum

(The second symmetric power  is sometimes called the symmetric square of ).

This can be proved by various means.

In the case of a vector space or a free module, the gradation is the gradation of the polynomials by the total degree.

One can also define  as the solution of the universal problem for -linear symmetric functions from  into a vector space or a module, and then verify that the direct sum of all  satisfies the universal problem for the symmetric algebra.

Relationship with symmetric tensors
As the symmetric algebra of a vector space is a quotient of the tensor algebra, an element of the symmetric algebra is not a tensor, and, in particular, is not a symmetric tensor. However, symmetric tensors are strongly related to the symmetric algebra.

A symmetric tensor is a tensor that is invariant under all these endomorphisms. The symmetric tensors of degree  form a vector subspace (or module) . The symmetric tensors are the elements of the direct sum  which is a graded vector space (or a graded module). It is not an algebra, as the tensor product of two symmetric tensors is not symmetric in general.

This is always the case with a ground field of characteristic zero. The inverse isomorphism is the linear map defined (on products of  vectors) by the symmetrization

The map  is not injective if the characteristic is less than +1; for example  is zero in characteristic two.

In summary, over a field of characteristic zero, the symmetric tensors and the symmetric algebra form two isomorphic graded vector spaces. They can thus be identified as far as only the vector space structure is concerned, but they cannot be identified as soon as products are involved. Moreover, this isomorphism does not extend to the cases of fields of positive characteristic and rings that do not contain the rational numbers.

Categorical properties
Given a module  over a commutative ring , the symmetric algebra  can be defined by the following universal property:

As for every universal property, as soon as a solution exists, this defines uniquely the symmetric algebra, up to a canonical isomorphism. It follows that all properties of the symmetric algebra can be deduced from the universal property. This section is devoted to the main properties that belong to category theory.

The symmetric algebra is a functor from the category of -modules to the category of -commutative algebra, since the universal property implies that every module homomorphism  can be uniquely extended to an algebra homomorphism 

The universal property can be reformulated by saying that the symmetric algebra is a left adjoint to the forgetful functor that sends a commutative algebra to its underlying module.

Symmetric algebra of an affine space
One can analogously construct the symmetric algebra on an affine space. The key difference is that the symmetric algebra of an affine space is not a graded algebra, but a filtered algebra: one can determine the degree of a polynomial on an affine space, but not its homogeneous parts.

For instance, given a linear polynomial on a vector space, one can determine its constant part by evaluating at 0. On an affine space, there is no distinguished point, so one cannot do this (choosing a point turns an affine space into a vector space).

Analogy with exterior algebra
The Sk are functors comparable to the exterior powers; here, though, the dimension grows with k; it is given by

where n is the dimension of V.  This binomial coefficient is the number of n-variable monomials of degree k.
In fact, the symmetric algebra and the exterior algebra appear as the isotypical components of the trivial and sign representation of the action of  acting on the tensor product  (for example over the complex field)

As a Hopf algebra
The symmetric algebra can be given the structure of a Hopf algebra. See Tensor algebra  for details.

As a universal enveloping algebra
The symmetric algebra S(V) is the universal enveloping algebra of an abelian Lie algebra, i.e. one in which the Lie bracket is identically 0.

See also
 exterior algebra, the alternating algebra analog
 graded-symmetric algebra, a common generalization of a symmetric algebra and an exterior algebra
 Weyl algebra, a quantum deformation of the symmetric algebra by a symplectic form
 Clifford algebra, a quantum deformation of the exterior algebra by a quadratic form

References
 

Algebras
Multilinear algebra
Polynomials
Ring theory